Barat may refer to:

People

Given name 

 Barat Ali Batoor (born 1983), Afghani photographer
 Barat Shakinskaya (1914–1999), Azerbaijani and Soviet stage and film actress

Surname 
 Anne-Marie Barat (1948–1990), French classical organist
 Carl Barât (born 1978), English musician, actor and author
 František Barát (born 1950), Czech footballer
 Kahar Barat (born 1950), Uyghur-American historian
 Leonid Barats, Russian actor, screenwriter and film producer
 Madeleine Sophie Barat (1779 – 1865), French Catholic saint
 Nicolas Barat (?–1706) French Catholic scholar of Hebrew works

Places 
 Barat, NWFP, Pakistan, a town 
 Barát, the Hungarian name for Baraţi, a village in Romania

Schools 
 Barat Academy in Chesterfield, Missouri, USA 
 Barat College, former college in Lake Forest, Illinois, USA
 Groupe scolaire Sophie-Barat in Châtenay-Malabry, France
 Sophie-Barat-Schule in Hamburg, Germany

Other uses 
 Shab-e-barat is a Muslim holiday celebrated on the 14th night of the month of Sha'aban
 Lailatul Barat or Mid-Sha'ban, a Muslim holiday
 Baalat, 'Lady of Byblos', was the goddess of the city of Byblos, Phoenicia in ancient times.
 Baraat, a wedding procession in parts of south Asia 
 Barat (wind)
 Barat (film), a 1942 Bollywood film 
 West direction in Malay languages, both Indonesian and Bahasa Malaysia

See also
 Bharat (disambiguation)
 Barad (name)
 Borat, a 2006 Sacha Baron Cohen mockumentary
 Borat Sagdiyev, central character in the mockumentary

Malay words and phrases
Indonesian words and phrases